The Myth of Male Power: Why Men are the Disposable Sex is a 1993 book by Warren Farrell, in which the author argues that the widespread perception of men having inordinate social and economic power is false, and that men are systematically disadvantaged in many ways.

Like Herb Goldberg's The Hazards of Being Male, Farrell's The Myth of Male Power is considered a standard of the men's movement, and has been translated into several languages, including German and Italian.

Defining male power and powerlessness

In The Myth of Male Power, Warren Farrell offered his first in-depth outline of the thesis he would eventually apply in his subsequent books—books on communication (Women Can’t Hear What Men Don’t Say), parenting (Father and Child Reunion), and the workplace (Why Men Earn More).
 
As The Myth of Male Power's title implies, Farrell challenges the belief that men have the power by challenging the definition of power. Farrell defines power as "control over one's life." He writes that, "In the past, neither sex had power; both sexes had roles: women's role was [to] raise children; men's role was [to] raise money."
 
One of the examples that Farrell uses to illustrate male powerlessness is male-only draft registration.  He writes that if any other single group (the examples he lists are Jews, African-Americans, and women) were selected based on their birth characteristics to be the only group required by law to register for potential death, we would call it anti-Semitism, racism or genocidal sexism. Men, he says, have been socialized to call it "glory" and "power," and as a result do not view this as a negative.

Farrell contends that this viewpoint creates psychological problems for both sexes: that "men's weakness is their facade of strength; women's strength is their facade of weakness."  He adds that societies have generally socialized boys and men to define power as, in essence, "feeling obligated to earn money someone else spends while we die sooner." Feeling obligated, he contends, is not power.

"Why Men are the Disposable Sex"
The subtitle of the book is "Why Men are the Disposable Sex." Farrell argues that historically both sexes were disposable in the service of survival: women risked death in childbirth; men risked death in war. However, Farrell notes, there is a key difference: women's disposability emanated more from biology; men's expendability required socialization.

Farrell observes various characteristics of modern US society, such as the tendency to assign higher-risk jobs - soldier, firefighter, coal miner, and so on - to men: almost all of the most hazardous professions are all-male, and segments within professions have higher percentages of men as their level of hazard increases. Other statistics, in conjunction with the lack of public outcry or mobilization around them, point in the same direction of male expendability. Men are victims of violent crime twice as often as women and are "three times more likely to be murder victims". Suicide rates are much higher for men than for women. While the death rates for breast cancer and prostate cancer are comparable, the US spends six times as much on breast cancer.

These statistics, Farrell suggests, can only be explained if US society places greater value on the lives of women than of men. Todd Jones cites this as an example of abductive reasoning: rightly or wrongly, Farrell assumes that such behavior is rational, and the only explanation then is that "women are actually perceived as the valuable gender (especially in evolutionary terms) who need to be protected and preserved at all cost, while men (a dime a dozen in evolutionary terms) are thought of as essentially disposable".

"Where Do We Go From Here?"

Farrell posits that men and women need to make an evolutionary shift from a focus on survival to a focus on a proper balance between survival and fulfillment.

He claims that the women's movement has led to the re-socialization of girls to become women who balance survival with fulfillment but that there has been no similar re-socialization of boys to become men who pursue that balance once they take on the responsibility of children. Thus, Farrell believes, boys and men are decades behind girls and women psychologically and socially, and increasingly behind women academically and economically.
In Farrell's recent presentations on this topic, he estimates that men are in 2011 where women were in 1961.

Farrell's political solution is "neither a women's movement blaming men nor a men's movement blaming women, but a gender transition movement." He defines a gender transition movement as one that fosters a transition from the rigid roles of our past to more flexible roles for the future.

The "Pay Paradox"
Men, Farrell posits, learn to earn money to gain the approval of their parents and the respect of other men; heterosexual men also learn to earn money to earn their way to female love ("Women don't marry men reading Why Men Are the Way They Are in the unemployment line.")

Farrell introduced in The Myth of Male Power a thesis that he pursued in-depth in Why Men Earn More in 2005: that earning money involves forfeiting power.  He goes on to describe his theory that earning money is less about power, and more about trade-offs. Farrell proposes that "the road to high pay is a toll road--you earn more when you pay 25 specific tolls such as working more hours, or taking less-fulfilling or more-hazardous jobs..."

Critical responses
Academic Kenneth Clatterbaugh, in an overview of literature of the men's movement, comments that "eventually, [Farrell's] arguments reach absurd heights, as when Farrell actually argues against sexual harassment laws and child molestation laws on the grounds that they give even more power (to abuse men) to (women) employees and children".

Feminist social critic Camille Paglia, writing for The Washington Post, says The Myth of Male Power "attacks the unexamined assumptions of feminist discourse with shocking candor and forces us to see our everyday world from a fresh perspective", though she added that Farrell is sometimes guilty of "questionable selectiveness or credulity about historical sources". Paglia nevertheless concludes that the book "is the kind of original, abrasive, heretical text that is desperately needed to restore fairness and balance to the present ideology-sodden curriculum of women's studies courses."

Reviewer Robert Winder describes the book as "shock-horror hyperbole posing as scholarship" and goes on to write "Farrell might be right to see the gender conflict as a war to which only one side has turned up, but this is only a sarcastic way of confessing to an authentic male worry: the twinge of jealousy men sometimes feel when confronted by feminine solidarity. Farrell, however, just like some of his female opposite numbers, prefers accusation to self-examination".

Linda Mealey notes that the book is recommended reading for educators in the social sciences, particularly gender studies; she does also critique Farrell for easily seeing causality in correlation.

Academic Margot Mifflin writes that "most of Farrell’s tit-for-tat theories about man’s greater societal burden are slanted, self-serving, and absurdly simplistic."

Anthropologist Melvin Konner writes that, like Christina Hoff Sommers' Who Stole Feminism? (1994), The Myth of Male Power is a good antidote to the way in which "real knowledge about sex roles...tends to get buried in postmodernist rhetoric."

The Los Angeles Times notes that "some critics say 'The Myth of Male Power' goes beyond the nurturing rituals of the male movement to mount an outright assault on the victories of the modern women's movement."

An article in Mother Jones notes that the book "has spawned a network of activists and sites that take Farrell’s ideology in a disturbing direction."

The book includes several factual errors concerning murderer Laurie Dann, who is used as an example of violence against men by women. Farrell states that all of her victims were male, that she burned down a Young Men's Jewish Council, burned two boys in a basement, shot her own son, and alleged that she killed an eight-year old rapist; none of these claims are true. Some men's rights activists, academics, and media figures have repeated Farrell's errors and conclusion. Farrell later issued a correction on his web site.

See also

 Men's Rights Movement
 John Gray
 Ken Wilber
 Richard Bolles
 The Manipulated Man

References

External links

 The Myth of Male Power Site
 Warren Farrell Profile Page at BigSpeak

1993 non-fiction books
American non-fiction books
Books by Warren Farrell
Criticism of feminism
English-language books
Men's rights
Philosophy of life
Masculist books